The 21. Fallschirmjäger-Division (21st Parachute Division) was a division of the German military during World War II, active in 1945.

The division was formed in March 1945 in the Netherlands, using elements of Sturm-Brigade Gericke and troops from the disbanded Fallschirmjäger Ausbildungs-und-Ersatz-Division.

The division did not manage to form fully before the end of the war, and did not see combat.

Notes

References

Fallschirmjäger divisions
Military units and formations established in 1945
Military units and formations disestablished in 1945